Liên Thủy is a commune (xã) in Lệ Thủy District, Quảng Bình Province, North Central Coast region of Vietnam. This commune is located on the right bank of Kiến Giang River. The commune contains villages: Uan Ao, Quy Hau. The eastern limit of this commune is National Route 1, northern border is Kiên Giang township, the district capital.

Communes of Quảng Bình province